Rupert Price Hallowes VC MC (5 May 1881 – 30 September 1915) was a British recipient of the Victoria Cross, the highest and most prestigious award for gallantry in the face of the enemy that can be awarded to British and Commonwealth forces.

He was born to F. B. and Mary Ann Taylor Hallowes, of Redhill, Surrey. He was 34 years old, and a temporary second lieutenant in the 4th Battalion, The Duke of Cambridge's Own (Middlesex Regiment), during the First World War. He was awarded the Victoria Cross for his actions between 25 and 30 September 1915 at Hooge, Belgium.

Citation

He died on 30 September 1915, and is buried at Bedford House Commonwealth War Graves Commission Cemetery, Zillebeke, near Ypres.

Further information
Hallowes' Victoria Cross is held as part of the collections of the National Army Museum, Chelsea, London. He was also a holder of the Military Cross. A peacetime scoutmaster, he is one of 32 Scouting related persons to win the Victoria Cross. There is a memorial to Rupert Hallowes on the ground floor of Neath Port Talbot Hospital at the entrance into 'Out Patients'.

References

Publications
Monuments to Courage (David Harvey, 1999)
The Register of the Victoria Cross (This England, 1997)
VCs of the First World War - The Western Front 1915 (Peter F. Batchelor & Christopher Matson, 1999)

External links
The Middlesex Regiment 1755-1966 (detailed history of the original "Die Hards")
The Brookwood Cemetery Society (Known Holders of the Victoria Cross Commemorated in Brookwood Cemetery)

1881 births
1915 deaths
Middlesex Regiment officers
British Army personnel of World War I
British World War I recipients of the Victoria Cross
British military personnel killed in World War I
Artists' Rifles soldiers
People from Redhill, Surrey
British Army recipients of the Victoria Cross
Burials at Bedford House Commonwealth War Graves Commission Cemetery
Military personnel from Surrey